The March Revolution ( or ) or Revolution of Forty-Five began on 6 March 1845, when the people of Guayaquil under the leadership of General António Elizalde and Lieutenant-Colonel Fernándo Ayarza revolted against the government. The people took the artillery barracks of Guayaquil  along with other military and civilian supporters, including the guard on duty. Flores surrendered on his plantation, La Elvira, near Babahoyo and accepted a negotiation - which had terms including his leaving power and the declaration of all his decrees, laws, and acts as void and null, ending fifteen years of foreign domination in Ecuador. Flores received 20,000 pesos for his property and immediately left the country for Spain. The country was then governed by the triumvirate composed of José Joaquín de Olmedo, Vicente Ramón Roca and Diego Noboa.

References
ECUADOR online - Triunvirato José Joaquín de Olmedo, Vicente Ramón Roca y Diego Noboa., (Spanish)
ECUADOR online - General Juan José Flores, (Spanish)
Cronología de la Historia Resumida del Ecuador, (English)

History of Ecuador
1845 in Ecuador
March 1845 events
Conflicts in 1845

de:Geschichte Ecuadors#Moreno-Herrschaft und Liberale Revolution